Sally Irvine is an Australian former professional tennis player.

Irvine, coached by Don Tregonning, was an Australian Open girls' doubles champion. She made the women's doubles semi-finals of the 1973 Australian Open, partnering Cynthia Doerner.

References

External links
 
 

Year of birth missing (living people)
Living people
Australian female tennis players
Grand Slam (tennis) champions in girls' doubles
Australian Open (tennis) junior champions